Murt Kelly  was an Irish Gaelic footballer. He played for his local club Beaufort and was a member of the Kerry senior inter-county team in the 1936 and 1944 seasons.

References
 http://www.terracetalk.com/kerry-football/player/381/Murt-Kelly

Year of birth missing (living people)
Possibly living people
Beaufort Gaelic footballers
Kerry inter-county Gaelic footballers
Munster inter-provincial Gaelic footballers